The 1980 AIAW National Division II Basketball Championship was the inaugural tournament hosted by the Association for Intercollegiate Athletics for Women to determine the national champion of collegiate basketball among its Division II members in the United States.

The tournament was held at the University of Dayton in Dayton, Ohio.

Hosts Dayton defeated College of Charleston in the championship game, 83–53, to capture the Flyers' first AIAW Division II national title.

Format
Twenty-four teams participated in a single-elimination tournament, with eight teams receiving byes into the second round. 

The tournament also included a third-place game for the two teams that lost in the semifinal games.

Tournament bracket

See also
1980 AIAW National Division I Basketball Championship
1980 AIAW National Division III Basketball Championship

References

AIAW women's basketball tournament
AIAW Division II
AIAW National Division II Basketball Championship
1980 in sports in Ohio
Women's sports in Ohio